St. Gregory's Church, Church of St Gregory, or variants thereof, may refer to:

Armenia
St. Gregory Church in Haghartsin Monastery
Saint Gregory the Illuminator Cathedral, Yerevan
Saint Gregory the Illuminator Church, Yerevan (destroyed)

Azerbaijan
Saint Gregory the Illuminator's Church, Baku

Georgia
Saint Gregory the Illuminator Church, Tbilisi (destroyed)

Malta
Il-Knisja ta' Santa Katerina l-Antika, known as Ta' San Girgor, in Żejtun.

Italy
San Gregorio Armeno, Naples

Singapore
Armenian Church, Singapore (dedicated to St. Gregory the Illuminator)

United States
 St. Gregory the Great Church, Danbury, Connecticut
Church of St. Gregory the Great (New York City)
St. Gregory's Church (St. Nazianz, Wisconsin)

United Kingdom

England
St Gregory's Church, Bedale
St Gregory's Church, Cheltenham, Gloucestershire
St Gregory's Church, Heckingham, Norfolk
St Gregory's Minster, Kirkdale, North Yorkshire
St Gregory by St Paul's, City of London (destroyed)
St Patrick's Church, Preston Patrick, Cumbria (formerly St Gregory's)
Church of St Gregory, Stoke St Gregory, Somerset
Church of St Gregory, Weare, Somerset
St Gregory's Church, Vale of Lune, Cumbria

Scotland
St. Gregory's Church, Preshome

See also
St. Gregory's Abbey, Three Rivers, Michigan, United States
Saint Gregory the Great Parish Church (disambiguation)
Saint Gregory the Illuminator Church (disambiguation)